A Todo Color (In Living Color) is the eleventh studio album by La Mafia released on February 7, 1987. The album entered at number twenty-three on the Latin regional Billboard charts and reached number eight by March.  On September 15, 2017 a re-mastered version of the album was released in digital form.

Track listing

References

1987 albums
La Mafia albums
Spanish-language albums